Kneel Cohn (born January 12, 1976) in The Bronx, New York is the primary songwriter, lead singer and guitarist for Warshow Angels, and The Dead Stars On Hollywood, known for the songs "Prozac Smile" and "Flaunt it Like This". He has performed with, produced songs and done remixing and production work with bands including Collide, Contagion, Patti Rothberg, and members of Crass, Buzzcocks, The Dandy Warhols, Hanoi Rocks, UK Subs, Consolidated, Black 'n Blue and Sin Corporation.

He appears in the film Blast, starring Liesel Matthews, Adam LaVorgna and PJ Soles, a cameo in the documentary Vegucated. and the CFEI documentary "Home On The Range" (2016).

Cohn is vegan and known for his involvement in animal rights issues. He regularly performs and DJs on behalf of many animal rights organizations including Farm Sanctuary, Animals Asia, and CFEI. In April 2009 he designed and launched Vegetable Slut, a line of animal rights activist pinback buttons and t-shirts.

He produced Home On The Range, a farm animal benefit compilation CD and documentary film for the non-profit organization CFEI (Compassionate Farming Education Initiative). The album includes songs by Moby, Joan Jett, Yoko Ono, Bright Eyes, The Pretenders, Nellie McKay, Howard Jones, Princess Superstar and Warshow Angels.

Biography

Personal life
Kneel's former girlfriend Barbara Swan is the cousin of Kathleen Hanna of the bands Bikini Kill (credited for starting the riot grrrl movement) and Le Tigre.

Kneel is credited for the skating name of roller derby all-star "Baby Ruthless" of New York City's Gotham Girls Roller Derby. A character inspired by her known as "Babe Ruthless" is portrayed by Elliot Page in the Drew Barrymore film Whip It. The original Baby Ruthless, Cohn's ex-girlfriend, is featured in the UK band Towers Of London's music video for their song "How Rude She Was".

References

Armstrong, Carter (music editor). V/A View. The Album Network, December, 1998.
Black, Jett. Unleashing Anthems. In Music We Trust, October 2008
Brown, Tiffany Lee. Kill Your Television?. Portland Mercury, March 1, 2001.
Rosen, Johnathan (editor). Virtually Alternative. The Album Network, November, 1999.
Black Velvet, Shari Futuristic Sparkly Glam Pop. Black Velvet Magazine's Save A Scream, November 2008

Other websites 

The Official Warshow Angels website
The Official Home On The Range benefit website
The Official Dead Stars On Hollywood website
The Official Dead Stars On Hollywood myspace
The Official Discogs website

1976 births
American rock guitarists
American male guitarists
American rock singers
American rock songwriters
American male singer-songwriters
Singer-songwriters from New York (state)
Living people
Musicians from the Bronx
Musicians from Portland, Oregon
Singer-songwriters from Oregon
Guitarists from Oregon
Guitarists from New York (state)
21st-century American singers
21st-century American guitarists
21st-century American male singers